Doblička Gora is a settlement north of Dobliče in the Municipality of Črnomelj in the White Carniola area of southeastern Slovenia. The area is part of the traditional region of Lower Carniola and is now included in the Southeast Slovenia Statistical Region.

The local church is dedicated to Saint Vitus and belongs to the Parish of Črnomelj. It was built in 1824 to replace a 17th-century building.

References

External links
Doblička Gora on Geopedia

Populated places in the Municipality of Črnomelj